Ebonol may refer to:

Ebonol (material), a synthetic material similar to an ebony wood
Ebonol C, a black oxide process for copper and copper alloys
Ebonol Z, a black oxide process for zinc and zinc alloys